Markus Kupferblum (born 12 June 1964) is an Austrian theatre and opera director, playwright and clown. He founded the first Austrian Fringe Opera Company, Totales Theater, in Vienna and is an expert on commedia dell'arte and mask theatre.

He studied at the University of Vienna, at the School of Philippe Gaulier and Monika Pagneux in Paris and at New York University.
He was assistant to Antoine Vitez and Achim Freyer. 

Since 2013 he has been the founder and director of the interdisciplinary music theatre ensemble Schlüterwerke in Vienna.

He has directed and shown productions in France, Austria, Germany, England, Spain, Belgium, the United States of America, Korea, Armenia, Lebanon, Iran, Israel, Russia, Lithuania, Luxemburg, Peru,  Turkey, Switzerland, and Italy.

He was awarded the "1. Prix de l'Humour" at the Avignon Festival in 1993 and is known for working across the genres of opera, circus, theatre, and film and exploring unusual performance spaces for his productions.

In 2007 he received the Nestroy Theatre Prize for the best German-language fringe production for his play The Abandoned Dido.

In 2012 he founded the European Theatre Day of Tolerance which is commemorated on every 1 February. On this occasion a Memorandum for peace and tolerance is read before the performances of almost 1,000 theaters throughout Europe and beyond.

In 2013 his book Die Geburt der Neugier aus dem Geist der Revolution. Die Commedia dell'Arte als politisches Volkstheater was published by Facultas, Vienna University Press.

He has taught acting, directing and creative writing at, for example, the University of Vienna, Max Reinhardt Seminar, University of Music and Performing Arts (Vienna), University of Applied Arts (Vienna), Rutgers University, Michigan University, Southeastern Louisiana University, Yale University, New Haven, Columbia University und der CUNY University, both in New York City, and the New England Conservatory in Boston, the Hochschule für Musik und Darstellende Kunst Frankfurt, Theaterakademie August Everding München, Escuela Nacional del Teatro de Bolivia, and others.

Since 2018 he has been Senior Lecturer at the University of Music and Performing Arts, Vienna, where he teaches opera directing and drama for singers.

2019 he received the Operetta Award "Operetten Frosch" by the Bavarian National Radio for his production of the Operetta Cloclo by Franz Lehár.

He is a member of the International P.E.N. Club.

Notes

External links 
 Website of Markus Kupferblum
 Literature by Markus Kupferblum in the catalogue of the Austrian National Library
 Joanneum National Museum – The Power of Masks

1964 births
Austrian clowns
Austrian male writers
Austrian theatre directors
Living people